Chris Bruton (born January 23, 1987) is a Canadian former professional ice hockey player, who most notably played in the American Hockey League (AHL).

Playing career
On May 21, 2013, the New York Islanders of the National Hockey League (NHL) signed Chris to a one-year, two-way contract. After attending the Islanders 2013 training camp, he was assigned to their  AHL affiliate, the Bridgeport Sound Tigers, for the duration of the 2013–14 season.

On July 30, 2015, Bruton left the AHL and signed a one-year contract with Scottish club, Braehead Clan of the EIHL, before being traded and ending his professional career with the Coventry Blaze.

Career statistics

Awards and honors

References

External links

1987 births
Living people
Acadia Axemen ice hockey players
Alaska Aces (ECHL) players
Braehead Clan players
Bridgeport Sound Tigers players
Canadian ice hockey centres
Coventry Blaze players
Grand Rapids Griffins players
Peoria Rivermen (AHL) players
Spokane Chiefs players
Ice hockey people from Calgary
Canadian expatriate ice hockey players in the United States
Canadian expatriate ice hockey players in Scotland
Canadian expatriate ice hockey players in England